An election for Mayor of New York City was held on November 7, 2017. Incumbent Democrat Bill de Blasio won reelection to a second term with 66.2% of the vote against Republican Nicole Malliotakis.

Background
Bill de Blasio was elected mayor of New York City in 2013, with his term beginning January 1, 2014. De Blasio declared his intention to seek reelection in April 2015.

The following candidates filed petitions to have their names on the ballot during the primary elections: Democrats Bill De Blasio, Sal Albanese, Robert Gangi, Richard Bashner and Michael Tolkin, and Republicans Nicole Malliotakis, Rocky De La Fuente and Walter Iwachiw.

On May 9, 2017, the Libertarian Party nominated Aaron Commey. It was Commey's first run for political office. On August 1, 2017, the City Board of Elections determined in a hearing that Rocky De La Fuente had not received enough petition signatures to qualify for the Republican primary ballot. With De La Fuente's disqualification and the remaining Republican candidate, Walter Iwachiw, not reporting any fundraising for this election, Nicole Malliotakis was the only remaining candidate for the Republican nomination.

There were two Democratic primary debates, on August 23 and September 6. The candidates were incumbent mayor Bill De Blasio and former City Council member Sal Albanese. De Blasio won the primary.

The first general election debate was held on October 10, with De Blasio, Republican challenger Nicole Malliotakis, and independent candidate Bo Dietl. The second was held on November 1.

Democratic primary

Candidates

Nominated
 Bill de Blasio, incumbent mayor of New York City

Declared
 Sal Albanese, former city councilman and candidate for mayor in 1997 and 2013
 Richard Bashner, real estate attorney
 Robert Gangi, activist
 Michael Tolkin, entrepreneur

Withdrew
 Tony Avella, state senator, former city councilman and candidate for mayor in 2009
 Michael Basch, chief business officer of The Future Project
 Kevin P. Coenen, Jr., firefighter (ran in 2009 and 2013 NYC mayor elections as well)
 Bo Dietl, former Fox News contributor and former New York City Police Department detective (ran on the Independent line)
 Scott Joyner, Community Advocate & Service Sector Worker (did not file for the primary ballot)
 Joel Roderiguez, Police Officer
 Eric Roman (did not file for the primary ballot)
 Collin Slattery, entrepreneur (did not file for the primary ballot)
 Josh Thompson, education activist (dropped out to join Republican Paul Massey's campaign)

Declined
 Preet Bharara, former United States Attorney for the Southern District of New York
 Hillary Clinton, former U.S. Secretary of State, former U.S. Senator, former First Lady and nominee for President in 2016
 Rubén Díaz, Jr., Bronx Borough President (running for re-election)
 Shaun Donovan, former Director of the Office of Management and Budget and former United States Secretary of Housing and Urban Development
 Harold Ford, Jr., former U.S. Representative from Tennessee's 9th congressional district
 Letitia James, New York City Public Advocate (running for re-election)
 Hakeem Jeffries, U.S. Representative from New York's 8th congressional district
 Melissa Mark-Viverito, Speaker of the New York City Council
 Eva Moskowitz, founder and CEO of Success Academy Charter Schools
 Christine Quinn, former Speaker of the New York City Council and candidate for Mayor in 2013
 Scott Stringer, New York City Comptroller (running for re-election)
 Anthony Weiner, former U.S. Representative for New York's 9th congressional district and candidate for mayor in 2005 and 2013
Keith L. T. Wright, former State Assemblyman

Primary results

Republican primary

Candidates

Nominated
 Nicole Malliotakis, state assemblywoman

Withdrew
 Darren Dione Aquino, actor and disabled rights activist (did not File for the primary ballot)
 Bo Dietl, former Fox News contributor and former New York City Police Department detective (ran on the Independent line)
 Michel Faulkner, pastor and former New York Jets player (ran for comptroller)
 Rocky De La Fuente, businessman, Reform Party and American Delta Party nominee for president in 2016, Democratic candidate for president in 2016 and Democratic candidate for the U.S. Senate from Florida in 2016 (disqualified from the Republican ballot by not having enough signatures)
 Anniello (Neil) V. Grimaldi, attorney (did not file for the primary ballot)
Walter Iwachiw, Businessman
 Paul Massey, businessman

Declined
 John Catsimatidis, businessman and candidate for mayor in 2013
 Raymond Kelly, former New York City Police Commissioner
 Donald Trump Jr., businessman and son of President of the United States Donald Trump
 Eric Ulrich, city councilman (running for re-election)

Endorsements

Major third parties
Besides the Democratic and Republican parties, the Conservative, Green, Working Families, Independence, Reform, and Women's Equality parties are qualified New York parties, with automatic ballot access.

After Paul Massey dropped out of the mayoral race, the Independence Party failed to submit another nominee.

Albanese was nominated by the Reform Party Committee. On September 12, 2017, an Opportunity to Ballot was held to determine whether Albanese would retain the party's nomination. Dietl and Malliotakis each attempted to the secure the party line. Albanese won the race with approximately 57% of the vote, defeating the write-in campaigns.

Conservative

Nominee
 Nicole Malliotakis, state assemblywoman

Green

Nominee
 Akeem Browder, activist

Reform

Nominee
 Sal Albanese, former city councilman and candidate for mayor in 1997 and 2013

Working Families

Nominee
 Bill de Blasio, incumbent mayor

Minor third party and independent candidates

Libertarian

Nominee
 Aaron Commey, director of events for the Manhattan Libertarian Party

Independents

Candidates
 Bo Dietl, former Fox News contributor and former New York City Police Department detective (running on the "Dump the Mayor" line)
 Mike Tolkin, entrepreneur (running on the "Smart Cities" line)
Dr. Robbie Gosine

Withdrew
 Eric Armstead, security manager
 Scott Berry, musician, author (did not qualify for ballot)
 Garrett M. Bowser, self-employed (did not qualify for ballot)
 Abbey Laurel-Smith, founder of The Pilgrims Alliance Party of America (did not qualify for ballot)
 Ese O'Diah, CEO of Liquorbox
 Karmen M. Smith, volunteer team leader with New York Cares (did not qualify for ballot)
 Ahsan A. Syed (ran on the Theocratic Party line)

General election

Endorsements

Polling

Results

A total of 5,343 write-in votes were also certified by the Board of Elections. These included 982 votes for former mayors Michael Bloomberg, 12 for Rudy Giuliani, 9 for Fiorello La Guardia (deceased), 10 for Robbie Gosine, 3 for David Dinkins, and one each for John Lindsay, Abraham Beame, and Ed Koch (the latter three deceased), and 857 that could not be attributed to anybody or counted. The only other people to receive more than 100 write-in votes were former Sen. Hillary Clinton (240) and Christine Quinn, the former Speaker of the New York City Council (195).

References

External links
 Sal Albanese (RF) for Mayor
 Akeem Browder (G) for Mayor
 Aaron Commey (L) for Mayor
 Bill de Blasio (D) for Mayor
 Bo Dietl (I) for Mayor
 Nicole Malliotakis (R) for Mayor

2017
New York City
New York City mayoral
mayoral election
New York City mayoral election
Bill de Blasio